Talalaivka is a village in Pryluky Raion, Chernihiv Oblast (province) of northern Ukraine. It hosts the administration of Talalaivka settlement hromada, one of the hromadas of Ukraine. Population: 

Until 18 July 2020, Talalaivka was the administrative center of Talalaivka Raion. The raion was abolished in July 2020 as part of the administrative reform of Ukraine, which reduced the number of raions of Chernihiv Oblast to five. The area of Talalaivka Raion was merged into Pryluky Raion.

References

Romensky Uyezd
Urban-type settlements in Pryluky Raion